Mário Cochrane de Alencar (30 January 1872 – 8 December 1925) was a Brazilian poet, short story writer, journalist, lawyer and novelist. He was one of the children of famous novelist José de Alencar.

He occupied the 21st chair of the Brazilian Academy of Letters from 1905 until his death in 1925.

Biography
Born in Rio de Janeiro, to famous novelist José de Alencar and Georgina Augusta Cochrane, daughter of a British aristocrat. He was the grandson of politician José Martiniano Pereira de Alencar, nephew of diplomat Leonel Martiniano de Alencar, the Baron of Alencar, and brother of politician and diplomat Augusto de Alencar. He made his primary studies in the Colégio Pedro II and graduated in law at the Faculdade de Direito da Universidade de São Paulo.

He collaborated for newspapers such as Brasilea (1917), Correio do Povo (1880), Gazeta de Notícias (1894), O Imparcial and A Imprensa (1900), Jornal do Commercio, O Mundo Literário, Renascença, Revista Brasileira (1895–1899) and the Official Magazine of the Brazilian Academy of Letters. He wrote under the pen names Deina and John Alone in some of those.

Trivia
Chronicler Carlos Heitor Cony alleges that Mário could have been an illegitimate son of Machado de Assis, since both Mário and Joaquim suffered from epilepsy, while José de Alencar did not. Mário also called Machado de Assis "father" constantly in his letters addressed to him. This affair allegedly served as inspiration for Assis' famous novel Dom Casmurro.

Works
 Lágrimas (1888)
 Versos (1902)
 Ode Cívica ao Brasil (1903)
 Dicionário de Rimas (1906)
 Alguns Escritos (1910)
 O Que Tinha Que Ser (1912)
 Se Eu Fosse Político (1913)
 Catulo da Paixão Cearense (1919)
 Contos e Impressões (1920)

References

External links
 Works by Mário de Alencar 
 Mário de Alencar's biography at the official site of the Brazilian Academy of Letters 

1872 births
1925 deaths
Writers from Rio de Janeiro (city)
Brazilian people of British descent
Brazilian male novelists
Brazilian male poets
Brazilian male short story writers
Brazilian journalists
Male journalists
Members of the Brazilian Academy of Letters
University of São Paulo alumni
Portuguese-language writers
20th-century Brazilian poets
20th-century Brazilian short story writers
20th-century Brazilian male writers
20th-century Brazilian novelists
Brazilian people of Scottish descent